This is a list of the mayors of the City of Boroondara, a local government area, in Melbourne, Australia. The City of Boroondara was formed in 1994 with the amalgamation of the City of Kew, City of Hawthorn and the City of Camberwell. The mayor is elected by councillors yearly at a full council meeting.

Mayors (1996 to present)

See also
 City of Boroondara
 Hawthorn Town Hall
 Camberwell Town Hall
 List of town halls in Melbourne
 Local government areas of Victoria

References

External links
Boroondara City Council

Boroondara
Mayors Boroondara
City of Boroondara